Antony Durant Gibbs, 5th Baron Aldenham, 3rd Baron Hunsdon of Hunsdon (18 May 1922 – 25 January 1986), was a British peer, the son of Walter Durant Gibbs, 4th Baron Aldenham. He succeeded to the titles 3rd Baron Hunsdon, and 5th Baron Aldenham on 30 May 1969.

He married Mary Elizabeth Tyser, on 16 July 1947. They had four children.
 Vicary Tyser Gibbs, 6th Baron Aldenham (b. 9 June 1948)
 George Henry Paul Gibbs (b. 17 June 1950)
 William Humphrey Durant Gibbs (1954–1973)
 Antonia Mary Gibbs (b. 10 July 1958)

References

1922 births
1986 deaths
People educated at West Downs School
Royal Naval Volunteer Reserve personnel of World War II
Antony
Antony
3